Emesa tenerrima is a thread-legged bug from the genus Emesa. It is found in semi-evergreen forest in Puerto Rico. E. tenerrima lives in the webs of the spider Modisimus signatus which it also physically resembles.

References

 https://web.archive.org/web/20120307184843/http://md1.csa.com/partners/viewrecord.php?requester=gs&collection=ENV&recid=2051251&q=Ghilianella&uid=788329544&setcookie=yes
 

Reduviidae
Endemic fauna of Puerto Rico
Insects described in 1860